The Abbey Church of Saint-Savin-sur-Gartempe is a Roman Catholic church located in Saint-Savin-sur-Gartempe, in Poitou, France. The Romanesque church was begun in the mid-11th century and contains many beautiful 11th- and 12th-century murals which are still in a remarkable state of preservation. The church is often referred to as the "Romanesque Sistine Chapel" and has been a UNESCO World Heritage Site since 1983.

History
The Abbey Church of Saint-Savin sur Gartempe was an ancient abbey that is thought was founded by Saint Benoît d’Aniane under the protection of Charlemagne and his immediate successors, although its early history remains obscure. The church was rebuilt starting in 1023. The paintings in the main church are believed to have been painted between 1095 and 1115.

Description
The cruciform church carries a square tower over its crossing. The transept was built first, then the choir with its ambulatory with five radial chapels in the polygonal apse. In the next building campaign, three bays of the nave were added, the bell tower and its porch, and finally the last six bays of the nave. The bell tower is finished by a fine stone spire more than 80 meters high, added in the 14th century and restored in the 19th century. The barrel vaulted nave is supported on magnificently-scaled columns with foliate capitals.

Nearly all parts of church are covered in painted murals, depicting scenes from across the Bible. The murals in the doorway describe the Apocalypse, while the gallery holds scenes from the Passion of Christ. In the choir and on the piers of the transept are images of the saints, and the vault describes scenes from the books of Genesis and Exodus. Below the church is the crypt of the martyr brothers St Savin and St Cyprian, decorated with frescos depicting scenes from their lives.

Gallery

See also
 French Romanesque architecture

References

External links

 Fully illustrated description of the church 

World Heritage Sites in France
Saint-Savin-sur-Gartempe
Saint-Savin-sur-Gartempe
Saint-Savin-sur-Gartempe
Saint-Savin-sur-Gartempe